The White Gorilla is a 1945 American film directed by Harry L. Fraser and starring Ray Corrigan, Lorraine Miller, and Clyde Beatty. The film was made by re-editing the 1927 silent film Perils of the Jungle, and adding new footage as a framing plot. This was done without regard to differences in film quality or speed. This film is in the public domain.

Plot summary

Cast 
Ray Corrigan as Steve Collins / Konga, the White Gorilla / Narrator
Lorraine Miller as Ruth Stacey
Clyde Beatty as Bradford

References

External links 

1945 films
1945 adventure films
1940s English-language films
American black-and-white films
Films directed by Harry L. Fraser
American adventure films
Films with screenplays by Harry L. Fraser
1940s American films